Raúl Alberto Páez (born 26 May 1937) is a former Argentine association football player.

Páez began his career in 1958 at San Lorenzo de Almagro in Buenos Aires. With San Lorenzo he won the 1959 Argentine Primera División and took part in the 1960 Copa Libertadores where they reached the semi-finals before getting knocked out by Uruguayan side C.A. Peñarol.

While at San Lorenzo Páez was called up to the Argentina squad for the 1962 FIFA World Cup in Chile, where they were eliminated in the group stage. Páez appeared in matches against England and Bulgaria.

He stayed with San Lorenzo until 1967 before moving to Quilmes Atlético Club where he retired after the 1968 season. In total he played 222 matches in the Argentine league and scored 3 goals.

External links

Raúl Páez at BDFA.com.ar 

1937 births
Argentine footballers
Argentina international footballers
1962 FIFA World Cup players
Argentine Primera División players
San Lorenzo de Almagro footballers
Quilmes Atlético Club footballers
Footballers from Córdoba, Argentina
Living people
Association football defenders